Perchang is a physics-based game about getting little balls into a funnel. It was released on IOS on June 22, 2016 by Perchang Games.

Gameplay 
In Perchang the player is tasked with getting a certain number of balls from a designated starting point to go into a funnel located somewhere else in the environment to complete a level. The player must get the required number of balls into the funnel in a certain time limit to complete the level. In most levels the path between the start and end points is like Rube Goldberg machine with elements (environmental objects) such as magnets and flippers that need to be properly operated to get the balls to the funnel. The environmental objects are colored red or blue. Tapping the red button activates the objects colored red and tapping the blue button activates the objects colored blue. The player can change the color of the environmental objects which is done by tapping on the object (if the object was red it will become blue and vice versa).

As the player progresses through the levels new elements are introduced such as magnets, flippers, fans, portals and more. The game has 60 levels, with 50 being regular levels (arranged in 10 areas) and 10 being bonus levels unlocked by getting a gold metal (done by completing the level in a certain amount of time or less) on all levels in an area.

On October 27, 2016, a black mode was added with new zero g levels.

Reception 
Perchang got mostly positive reviews. 148 Apps called the game a "beautifully minimalist puzzle game" and rated it 4 stars out of 5. A reviewer at Pocket Tactics said that the game "reminds me surprisingly strongly of playing Angry Birds". They gave the game 3 out of 5 stars saying that it was "attractive and engaging to think about, less enjoyable for which to perfect solutions". Apple'N'Apps gave the game a score of 4.0 out 5 praising that the game "combines thought and timing skill", has "varied contraptions", and has a "high quality design" while criticizing the fact that "some levels can be tedious" and "solutions can also drag out a bit". TouchArcade called the game like "Marble Madness meets Lemmings".

The game also reached the Top Charts for paid apps in the US and UK App Stores (it was in #3 position on July 5, 2016).

See also 
 Amazing Alex

References 

IOS games